William L. "Bill" Gormley (born May 2, 1946) is an American attorney and Republican Party politician whose career in New Jersey's state Legislature spanned four decades. Representing the state's 2nd Legislative District, which includes most of Atlantic County, Gormley emerged as an influential and dominating figure in New Jersey government and a leader in the continued economic revitalization of the greater Atlantic City region.

Gormley, the son of former Atlantic County Sheriff Gerard Gormley, was elected to the New Jersey General Assembly in 1977, serving until 1982. He served as a member of the state Senate from 1982 to 2007, a length of tenure unmatched in Atlantic County since state Sen. Frank S. Farley's 31-year-run ended in defeat in 1972.

Gormley chose not to seek re-election to the Senate in 2007.

Education and military service
Gormley graduated from St. Augustine Preparatory School in 1964. He received a B.A. from the University of Notre Dame in History and was awarded a J.D. from Villanova University. He served in the United States Marine Corps and was honorably discharged in 1975 with the rank of captain.

Political career
Gormley was first elected to the New Jersey General Assembly in 1977. In 1981, Gormley was the most vocal member of a small group of Republican lawmakers who aligned with Democrats to pass legislation that eliminated the practice of awarding favorable ballot positions to candidates endorsed by county political organizations. Though the courts would restore the party line years later, the legislation paved the way for Tom Kean to win the Republican gubernatorial primary against the Republican establishment candidate, Paterson Mayor Lawrence "Pat" Kramer. Kean would go on to serve two terms as one of the most popular governors in New Jersey history.

"Getting rid of the party line cracked Kramer and made Kean," recalled Republican campaign strategist Dave Murray. "What was so impressive about that is there were other guys supporting Kean, but Bill Gormley was the one shouting it from the rooftops. Really, there's only one word to describe him – and that's ballsy."

In 1990, Gormley cast the only Republican vote for then Gov. Jim Florio's ban on assault weapons and became a target of the National Rifle Association. As political payback, the NRA funded the campaigns of a string of Gormley opponents in both local races and runs for higher office.

Growth of Atlantic City
Gormley was credited with writing legislation to secure state funding for crucial development projects in the Atlantic City region including the Atlantic City Corridor Project (now "Tanger Outlets The Walk"), Boardwalk Hall, the Atlantic City Rail Terminal, the Atlantic City–Brigantine Connector, The Borgata, the Quarter at Tropicana Casino, "The Pier Shops at Caesars" now "Playground Pier"), the Atlantic City Convention Center, and Atlantic City International Airport.

In 1991, after suing the governor of New Jersey to protect the rights of coastal homeowners, Gormley wrote and secured passage for a constitutional amendment that defined and delineated the rights of property owners who held riparian lands. The amendment resolved a protracted and contentious legal dispute that had pitted the state's jurisdictional powers against private ownership rights.

In 1992, Gormley wrote a constitutional amendment that shifted the cost for the operation of the county court system to the state, creating a more coordinated and modern justice system.

Racial Profiling Hearings
As chairman of the Senate Judiciary Committee, Gormley led a 2001 investigation into the practice of racial profiling by New Jersey State Police. The nine days of hearings chaired by Gormley ultimately led to the enactment of reform legislation to eradicate the practice of racial profiling, including the creation of a system of oversight and monitoring to maintain integrity in law enforcement practices.

Electoral history
Over the course of his career, Gormley ran for higher office three times and lost in the primary each time. He ran for governor in 1989, the U.S. House of Representatives in 1994 and the U.S. Senate in 2000, when he lost to Bob Franks by 3,700 votes.

1989 Race for Governor (Republican primary)
Jim Courter (R), 29.02%
W. Cary Edwards (R), 22.04%
Chuck Hardwick (R), 21.29%
William Gormley (R), 17.17%
Gerald Cardinale (R), 8.33%
Tom Blomquist (R), 0.98%
Lois Rand (R), 0.66%
James A. Kolyer, III (R), 0.51%
1994 Race for U.S.House (Republican primary)
Frank LoBiondo (R), 54.47%
William Gormley (R), 35.26%
Robert D. Green (R), 10.27%
2000 Race for U.S. Senate (Republican primary)
Bob Franks (R), 35.68%
William Gormley (R), 34.10%
James W. Treffinger (R), 17.66%
Murray Sabrin (R), 12.56%

Charitable projects
Gormley has also been active in a number of philanthropic efforts and charitable projects in the Atlantic City region, benefitting organizations such as the Daughters of Our Lady of the Sacred Heart, Big Brothers and Big Sisters and the Sisters of Christian Charity. Gormley also helped lead fundraising efforts to build a facility for the Milton and Betty Katz Jewish Community Center in Margate, spearheaded the recruitment of speakers for a lecture series at the William J. Hughes Center for Public Policy at Stockton College (now Stockton University) and, along with his wife Virginia, founded the Atlantic City Friends of Music to raise money to support music and arts programs in Atlantic City schools. On Oct. 21, 2021, Gormley received the Gregor Mendel Medal, the highest honor bestowed by his alma mater, St. Augustine Preparatory School, for his many innovative charitable contributions to his community. A video tribute to Gormley included appearances from former New Jersey Attorney General John Farmer, Jr., former U.S. Environmental Protection Agency Administrator Lisa Jackson, and Port Authority of New York and New Jersey Chairman Kevin O’Toole, a former State Senate colleague.

Post-political career
In 2007, New Jersey Supreme Court Chief Justice Stuart Rabner appointed Gormley chairman of the Public Officers Salary Review Commission.

Gormley is currently a partner in the law firm of DLA Piper. He resides in Margate City, New Jersey with his wife, Virginia.

References

External links
Senator Gormley's Senate Website
New Jersey Voter Information Website 2003
New Jersey Legislature financial disclosure form for 2005 (PDF)
New Jersey Legislature financial disclosure form for 2004 (PDF)

Living people
1946 births
Republican Party members of the New Jersey General Assembly
County commissioners in New Jersey
Republican Party New Jersey state senators
People from Margate City, New Jersey
St. Augustine Preparatory School alumni
Notre Dame College of Arts and Letters alumni
Villanova University alumni